is a Japanese professional golfer.

Osanai plays on the Japan Golf Tour, where he has won four times between 1998 and 2010.

Professional wins (4)

Japan Golf Tour wins (4)

Japan Golf Tour playoff record (2–0)

Team appearances
World Cup (representing Japan): 1999

External links

Japanese male golfers
Japan Golf Tour golfers
Sportspeople from Tokyo
1970 births
Living people